John Sibley may refer to:
John Langdon Sibley (1804–1885), librarian of Harvard University
John Sibley (doctor) (1757–1837), American surgeon
John Churchill Sibley (1858–1938), composer and archbishop
Arthur 'John' Sibley (1912–1973), American animator

See also